Lynne Kera Barnett (born 1945 - died early 2017) as Lyn Barnett was a New Zealand singer who had success in her home country. Later she moved to Australia and also became popular there. She made many appearances on Australian TV. She had a hit with a cover of "Please Mr. Postman". She was also the sister of singer Christine Barnett. She died some time in early 2017.

Background
Barnett was born in Wellington, New Zealand.

Her sister Christine Barnett was a recording artist and had released a number of singles on the Lexian label, which included "Cry for You" and "Teenage Queen". Christine would also tour with Blerta in Australia in the 1970s.

In 1964 Lyn Barnett married Michael Puddefoot aka Mike Leyton, who sang in the Merseymen band.

Career

1960s
Barnett had a contract with the Viking label which ran from 1962 to 1963. During that period she released five singles. She also recorded an album Lyn for Viking backed by Garth Young and his Orchestra.

For the week ending 24 February 1962, Billboard reported that her version of "No Heart At All" was climbing rapidly in many charts.  By 31 March, her recording of "Please Mr. Postman" entered the New Zealand Top 10. By 28 April, it was at no. 6. By 5 May, it was at no. 4.

In 1962, her album which was credited to Lyn Barnett with Garth Young and his orchestra was released on Viking. The tracks included "On Again Off Again", "This Little Boy Of Mine", "Please Mr. Postman", and "No Heart At All".  The 7 July 1962 issue of Billboard reported that US Label Chancellor Records were very interested in her after Ron Dalton took her LP to the United States.<ref>Billboard, 7 July 1962 – [https://books.google.com/books?id=khcEAAAAMBAJ&dq=%22Lynn+Barnett%22Billboard&pg=PA20 Page 20 International News, NEW ZEALAND, Anzacs to See Top U.  S. Acts By FRED GEBBIE]</ref>

On 31 March 1963, she was booked to appear at the Stars of the Royal Command Show at the Opera House in New Plymouth. Other artists on the bill were Howard Morrison and Bill & Boyd.  Also in 1963 she had "Birthday Party" bw "That's Why I Love Him" released on the Lexian label, the same label her sister Christine had at least four singles released on.45Cat – Christine Barnett – Discography The following year "What If Johnny Says No" bw "Second Hand Rose" was released on RCA Victor.

In February 1964 she was set to take part in the "Startime Spectacular" which would tour the North Island. It was organized by promoter Jim Haddleton. The artists headlining included herself, Bill & Boyd and Max Merritt & The Meteors. At the last moment Barnett had to cancel. Max Merritt suggested that Dinah Lee should replace her. Lee was doing nightly 30 minute slots backed by The Meteors. Impressed by what he saw, Haddleton signed her up for a management deal and took control of Lee's career. Also that year Barnett had married Mike Leyton, who sang in the Merseymen band and at some stage they moved to Sydney.Sergent.com.au – Lyn Barnett

In June 1967, she appeared on the music show Bandstand.  Also that year she appeared in a couple of episodes of The Go!! Show. She appeared with The Mixtures and The Ram Jam Big Band, which aired on 30 August 1967.  On the episode that aired on 1 September 1967, Buddy England, The Groove and Billy Thorpe were also featured.

1970s
In 1970, The New Zealand Herald reported in its 4 July issue that she was based in Sydney and was engaged for a two-week stint at Tommo's Place. The following year she was involved in a car crash.
In 1974 she was featured in an article of the New Zealand Woman's Weekly in its 12 August issue. Also that year, Hammond Electrique by blind keyboard player Claude Papesch was released on the His Master's Voice label in Australia. The musicians that played on the album were Dave Donovan, Bruno Lawrence and Dave Ellis. She along with Papesch provided the backing vocals for the album.  During 1974 and 1975 she appeared multiple times on the Ernie Sigley Show.

Later years
In later years, she became reclusive. According to the Daily Telegraph'', she would refuse to answer her phone.  She was also a sufferer of the lung condition chronic obstructive pulmonary disease.

Death
She died some time in 2017. Her body had been lying undiscovered for about a month. The last time she was seen alive was on 30 January.  Police found her body on 27 February after neighbours sounded an alarm. Her friend Garvan Dormer who she had known for 40 years had last seen her in December 2016. He said she was feeling a bit down. Dormer wasn't even aware that she had died and he only found out about her death on Wednesday 19 July when he was included in her will. Even her younger sister Christine didn't know she had died until Lyn's nephew in New Zealand was contacted on 21 July.

She was buried without a funeral.

Discography

Appearances

References

External links
 Imdb: Lyn Barnett
 Lyn Barnett – The Happening 1967
 Lyn Barnett – The Happening 1968
 Lyn Barnett sings Georgie Girl

20th-century New Zealand women singers
New Zealand women pop singers
Viking Records artists
2017 deaths
People from Wellington City
1945 births